"Someone's Rocking My Dreamboat" is a song written by Leon René, Otis René and Emerson Scott in 1941.

It was recorded in 1941 by The Ink Spots (Decca 4045),  Erskine Hawkins (Bluebird B-11277), "Hutch" Leslie Hutchinson with Orchestra (HMV B.D.1006), and The Four Tones & Eddie Beal Trio (Make Believe Ballroom AM 02357-E).

It was first heard in a feature film in Bullet Scars (1942).  It was also heard in 1942 in Juke Girl and Wings for the Eagle. 1942 also saw versions of the song released by bandleaders Shep Fields, Benny Goodman, Woody Herman, and Artie Shaw.

Dinah Washington released a cover of the song on her 1957 album Dinah Washington Sings Fats Waller.

More modernly, the song was covered by Murray Head on his 1975 album Say It Ain't So (and released in 1976 as a single) and by Natalie Cole on her 1989 album Good to Be Back. Sally Timms covered the song on a 1988 album of that title. It also appears on the 1989 album 1812 by The Swingle Singers.

Cultural influence

The song was a favorite of Warner Bros. animators, appearing in at least eight WB cartoons, between 1942 and 1952. They included Crazy Cruise (1942), The Squawkin' Hawk (1942), A Tale of Two Kitties (1942), Bugs Bunny Nips the Nips (1944), The Big Snooze (1946), Roughly Squeaking (1946), Gorilla My Dreams (1948), and Kiddin' the Kitten (1952).

Experimental filmmaker Kenneth Anger made a juvenile film in 1941 titled Who Has Been Rocking My Dreamboat.

Jazzman Elvin Jones released a track named "Someone's Rocking My Jazzboat" on his 1975 New Agenda album. The song was written by saxophonist Frank Foster.

References

1941 songs
Songs written by Leon René
Songs about dreams
Songs about boats